Moghuls may refer to:

 Moghuls (TV series), an Indian television series about the Mughal Empire based on the novels of Alex Rutherford 
 Moghol people, Mongol ethnic group in Afghanistan

See also
 The Great Moghuls (film), a documentary series
 Empire of the Moghul, historical fiction novel series by Alex Rutherford
 Moghul (disambiguation)
 Mughal (disambiguation), an alternate spelling of Moghul
 Mogul (disambiguation)
 Mogol (disambiguation)